Iat is an ancient Egyptian minor goddess of milk and, by association, of nurturing and childbirth.

The goddess is sparsely attested, and what little we know of her is based upon a handful of mentions in the Pyramid Texts. These include the following:

 utterance PT 211/Pyr. 131, where it is said of the deceased king, "My foster-mother is Iat, and it is she who nourishes me, it is indeed she who bore me" (unknown translator) or "The Milk-Goddess is his attendant. She is the one who will make it possible for him to live: she in fact is the one who bore Unis" (James P. Allen’s translation);
 utterance PT 578/Pyr. 1537, where the dead king is told to take on her identity in order to reach the gods in the retinue of the sun: "you should take hold of them, in your identity of the north wind; they will take account of you, in your identity of Anubis; and the gods will not go down against you, in your identity of the Milk-Goddess";
 and utterance MAFS PT 1071, which counsels, "Since you are little, you should give your arm to the Sun and sit with your arm to the Milk-Goddess."

Etymology 

The name of the goddess resembles one Egyptian word for "milk", ; the more common work for milk, may also have some etymological connection to both.

See also 
 Egyptian pantheon

References 

Egyptian goddesses